Vlădeni is a commune in Iași County, Western Moldavia, Romania. It is composed of six villages: Alexandru cel Bun, Borșa, Broșteni, Iacobeni, Vâlcelele and Vlădeni.

References

Communes in Iași County
Localities in Western Moldavia